The 2017 Dhivehi Premier League season is the third season of the Dhivehi Premier League, first according to its new format. The season features eight teams; four teams from 2017 Malé League and for teams from 2017 Minivan Championship, each playing 14 matches during the regular season.

Qualified teams

''Note: Table lists clubs in alphabetical order.

Personnel

Note: Flags indicate national team as has been defined under FIFA eligibility rules. Players may hold more than one non-FIFA nationality.

Coaching changes

Foreign players

League table

Season summary

Round One & Two

Positions by round
The table lists the positions of teams after each week of matches.

Matches

First round
A total of 28 matches will be played in this round.

Week 1

Week 2

Week 3

Week 4

Week 5

Week 6

Week 7

Second round

A total of 28 matches will be played in this round.

Week 8

Week 9

Week 10

Week 11

Andrej Kerić Yasfaadh Habeeb Ashad Ali 
|goals2     = 
|stadium    = National Football Stadium, Malé
|attendance = 
|referee    = 
}}

Week 12

Week 13

Week 14

Season statistics

Top scorers

Hat-tricks

References

Dhivehi Premier League seasons
Maldives
1